Rapael Hartkopf (born 24 November 1998) is a German field hockey player.

Career

Club level
In club competition, Hartkopf plays for Mannheimer in the German Bundesliga.

Junior national team
Raphael Hartkopf made his debut for the German U–21 team in 2017. His first appearance was during a test series against England in Neustadt. Later that year he went on to win a bronze medal with the team at the EuroHockey Junior Championship in Valencia.

His final year with the team was 2019. He made multiple appearances throughout the year, competing in numerous test matches and at an eight-nations tournament in Madrid. He finished his junior career on a high, winning gold at the EuroHockey Junior Championship in Valencia.

Die Honamas
Hartkopf made his debut for Die Honamas in 2021, during season two of the FIH Pro League.

Following the retirements of senior players following the 2020 Summer Olympics, Hartkopf was officially added to the national squad.

References

External links
 
 

1998 births
Living people
German male field hockey players
Male field hockey forwards
Men's Feldhockey Bundesliga players
21st-century German people